Culdesac Tempe is an urban planning initiative that opened in the autumn of 2022.

Overview
Culdesac Tempe is a car-free neighborhood in the U.S. consisting of 1000 residents and zero cars or parking spaces, aside from a few for visitors. Culdesac Tempe is located in Tempe, Arizona, which is just 20 minutes from the center of downtown Phoenix. Culdesac Tempe is the first project for the startup Culdesac originally based out of San Francisco, California and now relocated to Tempe, Arizona. Ryan Johnson is the founder and chief executive of Culdesac. His primary motivations for starting up the company are that he believes the future of American cities will be walkable in the way that San Francisco and New York are and that the future of cities exists in the Sun Belt because sprawl heavy areas have seen the most drastic population increases in the last ten years.

Construction for Culdesac Tempe began in 2019. The project was estimated to cost $140 million, span 16 acres, and include 636 apartment units and 24,000 square feet of restaurant and retail space. The Phoenix metro area is commonly known as the capital of urban sprawl due to its status as the second-worst big city in America for walkers according to the website Walk Score. In most areas of Phoenix, residents rely heavily on personal vehicles for transportation. Culdesac eliminates the need for cars by providing all of the necessary services within the neighborhood. Plans are already in place for a grocery store, coffee shop, co-working space, market hall and shops on site at Culdesac Tempe. Another result of a ban on parking spaces is that there are more opportunities for green space including courtyards, gardens, and places to gather in community within the Culdesac Tempe neighborhood.

The architect working on design plans, Dan Parolek, coined the term missing middle housing to describe this type of walkable, sustainable housing. If the Culdesac model is successful in Tempe, the company plans to expand to other locations with the ultimate goal of creating the first car-free city in the United States.

References 

Tempe, Arizona
Car-free zones in the United States